Emilio Menéndez del Valle (born 20 June 1945 in Madrid) is a Spanish politician and Member of the European Parliament for the Spanish Socialist Workers' Party, part of the Party of European Socialists. He has served as Spanish ambassador to Jordan and to Italy.

Author of:

Angola. Imperialismo y Guerra Civil, Madrid, Akal Editor, 1976.

References

1945 births
Living people
Spanish Socialist Workers' Party MEPs
MEPs for Spain 1999–2004
MEPs for Spain 2004–2009
MEPs for Spain 2009–2014
Ambassadors of Spain to Jordan
Ambassadors of Spain to Italy